Logovskoye is a rural locality (a selo) and the administrative center of Logovskoy Selsoviet, Pervomaysky District, Altai Krai, Russia. The population was 1,417 as of 2013. There are 16 streets.

Geography 
Logovskoye is located 37 km northeast of Novoaltaysk (the district's administrative centre) by road. Beshentsevo is the nearest rural locality.

References 

Rural localities in Pervomaysky District, Altai Krai